Stolby ("pillars") may refer to:

 Stolby, Verkhoyansky District, Sakha Republic, a rural locality
 Stolby, Namsky District, Sakha Republic, a rural locality
 Stolby Nature Reserve, a rock formation nature reserve in the Krasnoyarsk Krai, Russia
 Lenskiye Stolby, a rock formation by the Lena River